Rockland is an unincorporated community in Del Norte County, California.

References

External links

Unincorporated communities in California
Unincorporated communities in Del Norte County, California